Vânători-Neamț is a commune in Neamț County, Western Moldavia, Romania. It is composed of four villages: Lunca, Mânăstirea Neamț, Nemțișor, and Vânători-Neamț.

The commune lies on the banks of the river Nemțișor. It is located in the northern part of the county, on the border with Suceava County.

Mânăstirea Neamț village is the site of Neamț Monastery.

The Vânători-Neamț Natural Park is partly situated on the territory of the commune; there are 17 European bisons in a protected  area in Vânători-Neamț.

Natives
 Theodora of Sihla

References

Communes in Neamț County
Localities in Western Moldavia